The Mayor of Brescia is an elected politician who, along with the Brescia's City Council, is accountable for the strategic government of Brescia in Lombardy, Italy.

The current Mayor is Emilio Del Bono (PD), elected on 9–10 June 2013 and re-elected for a second term on 10 June 2018.

Overview
According to the Italian Constitution, the Mayor of Brescia is a member of the City Council.

The Mayor is elected by the population of Brescia, who also elects the members of the City Council, the legislative body which checks the Mayor's policy guidelines and is able to enforce his resignation by a motion of no confidence. The Mayor is entitled to appoint and release the members of his executive.

Since 1994 the Mayor is elected directly by Brescia's electorate: in all mayoral elections in Italy in cities with a population higher than 15,000 voters express a direct choice for the mayor or an indirect choice voting for the party of the candidate's coalition. If no candidate receives at least 50% of votes, the top two candidates go to a second round after two weeks. The election of the City Council is based on a direct choice for the candidate with a preference vote: the candidate with the majority of the preferences is elected. The number of the seats for each party is determined proportionally on the base of a majority bonus system.

Podestà

Kingdom of Italy (1807-1814)

Kingdom of Lombardy–Venetia (1815-1859)

Mayors

Kingdom of Italy (1860–1946)

Republic of Italy (since 1946)

City Council election (1946–1994)
From 1946 to 1994 the Mayor of Brescia was elected by the City Council.

Notes

Direct election (since 1994)

Since 1994, under provisions of the new local electoral law (Law 25 March 1993, n. 81), the Mayor of Brescia is chosen by direct election, originally every four and since 1998 every five years.

Notes

Timeline

By time in office

Elections

City Council elections, 1946–1991

Number of votes for each party:

Notes

Number of seats in the City Coucl for each party:

Notes

Mayoral and City Council election, 1994
The election took place on two rounds: the first on 20 November, the second on 4 December 1994.
 

|- 
| colspan="7"| 
|-
|- style="background-color:#E9E9E9;text-align:center;"
! colspan="4" rowspan="1" style="text-align:left;" | Parties and coalitions
! colspan="1" | Votes
! colspan="1" | %
! colspan="1" | Seats
|-
| style="background-color:pink" rowspan="3" |
| style="background-color:" |
| style="text-align:left;" | Democratic Party of the Left (Partito Democratico della Sinistra)
| PDS
| 22,606 || 20.39 || 11
|-
| style="background-color:pink" |
| style="text-align:left;" | Italian People's Party (Partito Popolare Italiano)
| PPI
| 22,227 || 20.05 || 10
|-
| style="background-color:" |
| style="text-align:left;" | Others 
| 
| 8,656 || 7.81 || 3
|- style="background-color:pink"
| style="text-align:left;" colspan="4" | Martinazzoli coalition (Centre-left)
| 53,489 || 48.25 || 24
|-
| style="background-color:lightblue" rowspan="2" |
| style="background-color:" |
| style="text-align:left;" | Lega Nord 
| LN
| 17,416 || 15.71 || 6
|-
| style="background-color:" |
| style="text-align:left;" | Forza Italia 
| FI
| 13,416 || 12.10 || 4
|- style="background-color:lightblue"
| colspan="4" style="text-align:left;" | Gnutti coalition (Centre-right)
| 30,832 || 27.81 || 10
|-
| style="background-color:" |
| style="text-align:left;" colspan="2" | National Alliance (Alleanza Nazionale)
| AN
| 13,460 || 12.14 || 4
|-
| style="background-color:" |
| style="text-align:left;" colspan="2" | Communist Refoundation Party (Rifondazione Comunista)
| PRC
| 8,647 || 7.80 || 2
|-
| style="background-color:" |
| style="text-align:left;" colspan="2" | Others 
| 
| 4,430 || 3.99 || 0
|-
| colspan="7" style="background-color:#E9E9E9" | 
|- style="font-weight:bold;"
| style="text-align:left;" colspan="4" | Total
| 110,858 || 100.00 || 40
|-
| colspan="7" style="background-color:#E9E9E9" | 
|-
| style="text-align:left;" colspan="4" | Votes cast / turnout 
| 141,623 || 86.10 || style="background-color:#E9E9E9;" |
|-
| style="text-align:left;" colspan="4" | Registered voters
| 164,490 ||  || style="background-color:#E9E9E9;" |
|-
| colspan="7" style="background-color:#E9E9E9" | 
|-
| style="text-align:left;" colspan="7" | Source: Ministry of the Interior
|}

Mayoral and City Council election, 1998
The election took place on two rounds: the first on 29 November, the second on 13 December 1998.

|- 
| colspan="7"| 
|-
|- style="background-color:#E9E9E9;text-align:center;"
! colspan="4" rowspan="1" style="text-align:left;" | Parties and coalitions
! colspan="1" | Votes
! colspan="1" | %
! colspan="1" | Seats
|-
| style="background-color:pink" rowspan="5" |
| style="background-color:" |
| style="text-align:left;" | Democrats of the Left (Democratici di Sinistra)
| DS
| 12,520 || 13.13 || 9
|-
| style="background-color:purple" |
| style="text-align:left;" | Italian Democratic Socialists (Socialisti Democratici Italiani)
| SDI
| 10,338 || 10.84 || 7
|-
| style="background-color:pink" |
| style="text-align:left;" | Italian People's Party (Partito Popolare Italiano)
| PPI
| 8,142 || 8.54 || 5
|-
| style="background-color:" |
| style="text-align:left;" | Federation of the Greens (Federazione dei Verdi)
| FdV
| 2,110 || 2.21 || 1
|-
| style="background-color:" |
| style="text-align:left;" | Others 
| 
| 5,785 || 6.06 || 2
|- style="background-color:pink"
| style="text-align:left;" colspan="4" | Corsini coalition (Centre-left)
| 38,895 || 40.78 || 24
|-
| style="background-color:lightblue" rowspan="3" |
| style="background-color:" |
| style="text-align:left;" | Forza Italia 
| FI
| 18,310 || 19.20 || 7
|-
| style="background-color:" |
| style="text-align:left;" | National Alliance (Alleanza Nazionale)
| AN
| 11,869 || 12.45 || 3
|-
| style="background-color:" |
| style="text-align:left;" | Others 
| 
| 1,559 || 1.63 || 0
|- style="background-color:lightblue"
| colspan="4" style="text-align:left;" | Dalla Bona coalition (Centre-right)
| 31,738 || 33.28 || 10
|-
| style="background-color:" |
| style="text-align:left;" colspan="2" | Lega Nord & allies
| LN
| 18,495 || 19.39 || 5
|-
| style="background-color:" |
| style="text-align:left;" colspan="2" | Communist Refoundation Party (Rifondazione Comunista)
| PRC
| 3,488 || 3.66 || 1
|-
| style="background-color:" |
| style="text-align:left;" colspan="2" | Others 
| 
| 2,755 || 2.88 || 0
|-
| colspan="7" style="background-color:#E9E9E9" | 
|- style="font-weight:bold;"
| style="text-align:left;" colspan="4" | Total
| 95,371 || 100.00 || 40
|-
| colspan="7" style="background-color:#E9E9E9" | 
|-
| style="text-align:left;" colspan="4" | Votes cast / turnout 
| 124,360 || 77.07 || style="background-color:#E9E9E9;" |
|-
| style="text-align:left;" colspan="4" | Registered voters
| 161,358 ||  || style="background-color:#E9E9E9;" |
|-
| colspan="7" style="background-color:#E9E9E9" | 
|-
| style="text-align:left;" colspan="7" | Source: Ministry of the Interior
|}

Mayoral and City Council election, 2003
The election took place on two rounds: the first on 25–26 May, the second on 8–9 June 2003.

|- 
| colspan="7"| 
|-
|- style="background-color:#E9E9E9;text-align:center;"
! colspan="4" rowspan="1" style="text-align:left;" | Parties and coalitions
! colspan="1" | Votes
! colspan="1" | %
! colspan="1" | Seats
|-
| style="background-color:pink" rowspan="5" |
| style="background-color:" |
| style="text-align:left;" | Democrats of the Left (Democratici di Sinistra)
| DS
| 16,245 || 17.57 || 9
|-
| style="background-color:pink" |
| style="text-align:left;" | The Daisy (La Margherita)
| DL
| 10,172 || 11.00 || 6
|-
| style="background-color:purple" |
| style="text-align:left;" | Italian Democratic Socialists (Socialisti Democratici Italiani)
| SDI
| 5,094 || 5.51 || 3
|-
| style="background-color:" |
| style="text-align:left;" | Federation of the Greens (Federazione dei Verdi)
| FdV
| 1,758 || 1.90 || 1
|-
| style="background-color:" |
| style="text-align:left;" | Others 
| 
| 12,433 || 13.45 || 5
|- style="background-color:pink"
| style="text-align:left;" colspan="4" | Corsini coalition (Centre-left)
| 45,702 || 49.44 || 24
|-
| style="background-color:lightblue" rowspan="4" |
| style="background-color:" |
| style="text-align:left;" | Forza Italia 
| FI
| 11,999 || 12.98 || 5
|-
| style="background-color:" |
| style="text-align:left;" | National Alliance (Alleanza Nazionale)
| AN
| 8,207 || 8.88 || 4
|-
| style="background-color:" |
| style="text-align:left;" | Union of the Centre  (Unione di Centro)
| UDC
| 3,570 || 3.86 || 1
|-
| style="background-color:" |
| style="text-align:left;" | Others 
| 
| 6,156 || 6.65 || 1
|- style="background-color:lightblue"
| colspan="4" style="text-align:left;" | Beccalossi coalition (Centre-right)
| 29,932 || 32.37 || 11
|-
| style="background-color:" |
| style="text-align:left;" colspan="2" | Lega Nord & allies
| LN
| 11,175 || 12.75 || 4
|-
| style="background-color:" |
| style="text-align:left;" colspan="2" | Communist Refoundation Party (Rifondazione Comunista)
| PRC
| 3,008 || 3.25 || 1
|-
| style="background-color:" |
| style="text-align:left;" colspan="2" | Others 
| 
| 2,027 || 2.19 || 0
|-
| colspan="7" style="background-color:#E9E9E9" | 
|- style="font-weight:bold;"
| style="text-align:left;" colspan="4" | Total
| 92,444 || 100.00 || 40
|-
| colspan="7" style="background-color:#E9E9E9" | 
|-
| style="text-align:left;" colspan="4" | Votes cast / turnout 
| 120,013 || 77.14 || style="background-color:#E9E9E9;" |
|-
| style="text-align:left;" colspan="4" | Registered voters
| 155,570 ||  || style="background-color:#E9E9E9;" |
|-
| colspan="7" style="background-color:#E9E9E9" | 
|-
| style="text-align:left;" colspan="7" | Source: Ministry of the Interior
|}

Notes

Mayoral and City Council election, 2008
The election took place on 13–14 April 2008, the same dates of the national general election.

|- 
| colspan="7"| 
|-
|- style="background-color:#E9E9E9;text-align:center;"
! colspan="4" rowspan="1" style="text-align:left;" | Parties and coalitions
! colspan="1" | Votes
! colspan="1" | %
! colspan="1" | Seats
|-
| style="background-color:lightblue" rowspan="4" |
| style="background-color:" |
| style="text-align:left;" | The People of Freedom (Il Popolo della Libertà)
| PdL
| 28,985 || 28.32 || 14
|-
| style="background-color:" |
| style="text-align:left;" | Lega Nord 
| LN
| 16,222 || 15.85 || 8
|-
| style="background-color:" |
| style="text-align:left;" | Union of the Centre (Unione di Centro)
| UDC
| 3,939 || 3.85 || 2
|-
| style="background-color:" |
| style="text-align:left;" | Others
| 
| 2,448 || 2.40 || 0
|- style="background-color:lightblue"
| style="text-align:left;" colspan="4" | Paroli coalition (Centre-right)
|  51,594 || 50.41 || 24
|-
| style="background-color:pink" rowspan="4" |
| style="background-color:" |
| style="text-align:left;" | Democratic Party (Partito Democratico)
| PD
| 28,594 || 27.94 || 12
|-
| style="background-color:" |
| style="text-align:left;" | Rainbow Left (Sinistra Arcobaleno)
| SA
| 3,651 || 3.57 || 1
|-
| style="background-color:" |
| style="text-align:left;" | Italy of Values (Italia dei Valori)
| IdV
| 2,824 || 2.76 || 1
|-
| style="background-color:" |
| style="text-align:left;" | Others 
| 
| 2,576 || 2.52 || 0
|- style="background-color:pink"
| colspan="4" style="text-align:left;" | Del Bono coalition (Centre-left)
|  37,645 || 36.78 || 14
|-
| style="background-color:#D0FF14" |
| style="text-align:left;" colspan="2" | Brescia for Passion (Brescia per Passione)
| BpP
| 6,477 || 6.33 || 2
|-
| style="background-color:" |
| style="text-align:left;" colspan="2" | Others 
| 
|  6,641 || 6.49 || 0
|-
| colspan="7" style="background-color:#E9E9E9" | 
|- style="font-weight:bold;"
| style="text-align:left;" colspan="4" | Total
| 102,357 || 100.00 || 40
|-
| colspan="7" style="background-color:#E9E9E9" | 
|-
| style="text-align:left;" colspan="4" | Votes cast / turnout 
| 123,205 || 84.91 || style="background-color:#E9E9E9;" |
|-
| style="text-align:left;" colspan="4" | Registered voters
| 145,103 ||  || style="background-color:#E9E9E9;" |
|-
| colspan="7" style="background-color:#E9E9E9" | 
|-
| style="text-align:left;" colspan="7" | Source: Ministry of the Interior
|}

Mayoral and City Council election, 2013
The election took place on two rounds: the first on 26–27 May, the second on 9–10 June 2013.

|- 
| colspan="7"| 
|-
|- style="background-color:#E9E9E9;text-align:center;"
! colspan="4" rowspan="1" style="text-align:left;" | Parties and coalitions
! colspan="1" | Votes
! colspan="1" | %
! colspan="1" | Seats
|-
| style="background-color:pink" rowspan="5" |
| style="background-color:" |
| style="text-align:left;" | Democratic Party (Partito Democratico)
| PD
| 21,254 || 27.38 || 13
|-
| style="background-color:#D0FF14" |
| style="text-align:left;" | Brescia for Passion (Brescia per Passione)
| BpP
| 4,555 || 5.87 || 3
|-
| style="background-color:purple" |
| style="text-align:left;" | Del Bono List (Lista Del Bono)
| 
| 4,095 || 5.28 || 2
|-
| style="background-color:" |
| style="text-align:left;" | At Work with Brescia (Al Lavoro con Brescia)
| SEL
| 3,564 || 4.59 || 2
|-
| style="background-color:" |
| style="text-align:left;" | Others 
| 
| 1,504 || 1.94 || 0
|- style="background-color:pink"
| style="text-align:left;" colspan="4" | Del Bono coalition (Centre-left)
| 34,972 || 45.06 || 20
|-
| style="background-color:lightblue" rowspan="6" |
| style="background-color:" |
| style="text-align:left;" | The People of Freedom (Il Popolo della Libertà)
| PdL
| 11,180 || 14.40 || 5
|-
| style="background-color:"|
| style="text-align:left;" | X Civic Brescia (X Brescia Civica)
| XBC
| 7,463 || 9.62 || 3
|-
| style="background-color:" |
| style="text-align:left;" | Lega Nord 
| LN
| 6,724 || 8.66 || 2
|-
| style="background-color:" |
| style="text-align:left;" | Brothers of Italy (Fratelli d'Italia)
| FdI
| 2,132 || 2.75 || 0
|-
| style="background-color:" |
| style="text-align:left;" | Union of the Centre (Unione di Centro)
| UDC
| 1,942 || 2.50 || 0
|-
| style="background-color:" |
| style="text-align:left;" | Others
| 
| 1,212 || 1.57 || 0
|- style="background-color:lightblue"
| colspan="4" style="text-align:left;" | Paroli coalition (Centre-right)
|  30,653 || 39.49 || 10
|-
| style="background-color:" |
| style="text-align:left;" colspan="2" | Five Star Movement (Movimento Cinque Stelle)
| M5S
| 5,238 || 6.75 || 1
|-
| style="background-color:orange" |
| style="text-align:left;" colspan="2" | Civic Platform (Piattaforma Civica)
| PC
| 4,904 || 6.32 || 1
|-
| style="background-color:" |
| style="text-align:left;" colspan="2" | Others 
| 
|  1,847 || 2.39 || 0
|-
| colspan="7" style="background-color:#E9E9E9" | 
|- style="font-weight:bold;"
| style="text-align:left;" colspan="4" | Total
| 77,614 || 100.00 || 32
|-
| colspan="7" style="background-color:#E9E9E9" | 
|-
| style="text-align:left;" colspan="4" | Votes cast / turnout 
| 92,950 || 65.55 || style="background-color:#E9E9E9;" |
|-
| style="text-align:left;" colspan="4" | Registered voters
| 141,795 ||  || style="background-color:#E9E9E9;" |
|-
| colspan="7" style="background-color:#E9E9E9" | 
|-
| style="text-align:left;" colspan="7" | Source: Ministry of the Interior
|}

Notes

Mayoral and City Council election, 2018
The election took place on 10 June 2018.

|- 
| colspan="7"| 
|-
|- style="background-color:#E9E9E9;text-align:center;"
! colspan="4" rowspan="1" style="text-align:left;" | Parties and coalitions
! colspan="1" | Votes
! colspan="1" | %
! colspan="1" | Seats
|-
| style="background-color:pink" rowspan="5" |
| style="background-color:" |
| style="text-align:left;" | Democratic Party (Partito Democratico)
| PD
| 26,864 || 34.62 || 15
|-
| style="background-color:purple" |
| style="text-align:left;" | Del Bono List (Lista Del Bono)
| 
| 5,177 || 6.67 || 2
|-
| style="background-color:#D0FF14" |
| style="text-align:left;" | Brescia for Passion (Brescia per Passione)
| BpP
| 4,320 || 5.57 || 2
|-
| style="background-color:" |
| style="text-align:left;" | Left in Brescia (Sinistra a Brescia)
| SI
| 2,511 || 3.23 || 1
|-
| style="background-color:" |
| style="text-align:left;" | Others 
| 
| 2,312 || 2.96 || 0
|- style="background-color:pink"
| style="text-align:left;" colspan="4" | Del Bono coalition (Centre-left)
| 41,184 || 53.08 || 20
|-
| style="background-color:lightblue" rowspan="6" |
| style="background-color:" |
| style="text-align:left;" | Lega Nord 
| LN
| 18,758 || 24.17 || 7
|-
| style="background-color:" |
| style="text-align:left;" | Forza Italia 
| FI
| 5,867 || 7.56 || 3
|-
| style="background-color:" |
| style="text-align:left;" | Brothers of Italy (Fratelli d'Italia)
| FdI
| 2,560 || 3.29 || 1
|-
| style="background-color:" |
| style="text-align:left;" | Union of the Centre (Unione di Centro)
| UDC
| 750 || 0.96 || 0
|-
| style="background-color:#333399"|
| style="text-align:left;" | The People of Family (Il Popolo della Famiglia)
| PdF
| 586 || 0.75 || 0
|-
| style="background-color:" |
| style="text-align:left;" | Others
| 
| 1,450 || 1.86 || 0
|- style="background-color:lightblue"
| colspan="4" style="text-align:left;" | Vilardi coalition (Centre-right)
|  29,971 || 38.62 || 11
|-
| style="background-color:" |
| style="text-align:left;" colspan="2" | Five Star Movement (Movimento Cinque Stelle)
| M5S
| 4,340 || 5.59 || 1
|-
| style="background-color:" |
| style="text-align:left;" colspan="2" | Others 
| 
|  2,092 || 2.67 || 0
|-
| colspan="7" style="background-color:#E9E9E9" | 
|- style="font-weight:bold;"
| style="text-align:left;" colspan="4" | Total
| 77,587 || 100.00 || 32
|-
| colspan="7" style="background-color:#E9E9E9" | 
|-
| style="text-align:left;" colspan="4" | Votes cast / turnout 
| 83,276 || 57.40 || style="background-color:#E9E9E9;" |
|-
| style="text-align:left;" colspan="4" | Registered voters
| 145,064 ||  || style="background-color:#E9E9E9;" |
|-
| colspan="7" style="background-color:#E9E9E9" | 
|-
| style="text-align:left;" colspan="7" | Source: Ministry of the Interior
|}

Mayoral and City Council election, 2023
The election will take place on 14–15 May 2023, with a possible second round on 28–29 May.

Deputy Mayor

The office of the Deputy Mayor of Brescia was officially created in 1994 with the adoption of the new local administration law. The Deputy Mayor is nominated and eventually dismissed by the Mayor. 

Notes

References

External links

Brescia
 
Politics of Lombardy